Leaf celery (Apium graveolens var. secalinum Alef.), also called Chinese celery or Nan Ling celery, is a variety of celery cultivated in East Asian countries for its edible, flavorful stalks and leaves.
 
The stems are thinner than those of Western celery, and curved into round, hollow stalks. Also, unlike with Western celery, the leaves are used as well as the stalks.

See also
 Celery
 Celeriac
 List of vegetables

References

External links
 

Asian vegetables
Edible Apiaceae
Celery